María is a novel written by Colombian writer Jorge Isaacs between 1864 and 1867. It is a costumbrist novel representative of the Spanish Romantic movement. It may be considered a precursor of the criollist novels of the 1920s and 1930s in Latin America.

Despite being Isaacs' only novel, María is considered one of the most important works of 19th-century Spanish American literature. Alfonso M. Escudero characterized it as the greatest Spanish-language romantic novel. The Romantic style of the novel has been compared to the one of Chateaubriand's Atala. Notable is the description of the landscape and the artistic style of the prose.

The novel has several autobiographical elements, such as both main characters being natives of Valle del Cauca, or Efraín's departure to Bogotá to pursue his studies. It has been claimed that María herself is based, at least in part, upon a cousin of the author. The hacienda "El Paraíso", owned by Isaacs' family, also figures as an important location throughout the novel; it is currently preserved as a museum.

The story narrates the idyllic and tragic love between María and her cousin Efraín, both natives of Valle del Cauca. In the middle of a romantic and bucolic landscape, the young characters fall in love with each other but circumstances prevent the full realization of their love. The first hurdle is Efraín's departure for six years to Bogotá, the capital of Colombia, to pursue his high school education. After Efraín returns to Valle del Cauca the couple can live together, albeit for only three months before he is forced to travel to London to study medicine. Two years later Efraín returns to Colombia to find that María has died of illness. Heart-broken, Efraín decides to leave Cauca definitely, this time without a fixed destination.

Notes

See also

Jorge Isaacs
Colombian literature

External links 
 El Paraíso Museum photo gallery 
 Online text in Feedbooks 

1867 novels
19th-century Colombian novels
Novels set in Colombia
Colombian novels adapted into films